Rani Mundiasti (born 4 October 1984) is an Indonesian badminton player.

Career 
Mundiasti won the women's doubles at the 2006 Dutch Open with Endang Nursugianti. In 2008, Mundiasti was runner-up in the women's doubles with Jo Novita at the Denmark Super Series, losing to the Malaysian pair of Chin Eei Hui and Wong Pei Tty in the final. She was a member of Indonesia's 2007 Sudirman Cup (combined men's and women's) team which finished second to China.

Personal life 
When she was young, she joined the Jaya Raya Jakarta badminton club. Her father's name is Agus S. and her mother is Retno S. Her hobbies are reading and playing guitar. Generally people call her "Rani".

Achievements

BWF Superseries 
The BWF Superseries, which was launched on 14 December 2006 and implemented in 2007, was a series of elite badminton tournaments, sanctioned by the Badminton World Federation (BWF). BWF Superseries levels were Superseries and Superseries Premier. A season of Superseries consisted of twelve tournaments around the world that had been introduced since 2011. Successful players were invited to the Superseries Finals, which were held at the end of each year.

Women's doubles

  Superseries tournament

BWF Grand Prix 
The BWF Grand Prix had two levels, the Grand Prix and Grand Prix Gold. It was a series of badminton tournaments sanctioned by the Badminton World Federation (BWF) and played between 2007 and 2017. The World Badminton Grand Prix was sanctioned by the International Badminton Federation from 1983 to 2006.

Women's doubles

 BWF Grand Prix Gold tournament
 BWF & IBF Grand Prix tournament

BWF International Challenge/Series/Asian Satellite 
Women's doubles

References 

1984 births
Living people
Sportspeople from Jakarta
Indonesian female badminton players
Competitors at the 2007 Southeast Asian Games
Southeast Asian Games gold medalists for Indonesia
Southeast Asian Games medalists in badminton
21st-century Indonesian women
20th-century Indonesian women